Robert Elliott Allinson is an international philosopher of American origin. He is Professor of Philosophy at Soka University of America and was formerly Full Professor of Philosophy at the Chinese University of Hong Kong. He is the author/editor of nine books and over two hundred academic papers. His works primarily focus on four areas of philosophy: Original Theoretical Philosophy; Comparative Philosophy, Eastern and Western; Management Ethics, Environmental Ethics and Public Health Ethics; Holocaust and Sino-Judaic Comparative Philosophy.

Theoretical philosophy 
Robert Allinson is an original philosopher of theoretical philosophy. He has synthesized traditional, Western metaphysics, Platonic dialectic, Kantian epistemology, and Husserlian phenomenology and published the book A Metaphysics for the Future. His systematic philosophy takes advantage of both Critical philosophy and phenomenological introspection and proposes an epistemological/metaphysical mix as the foundation for philosophy. Lewis Hahn, Editor of Library of Living Philosophers, has commented, “With a new phenomenology, a distinctive method and unique modes of validation for philosophy, and an extraordinary command of both Eastern and Western philosophy, Professor Allinson develops his own bold, imaginative, and challenging system of philosophy.”

Robert Neville, Professor of Philosophy at Boston University, also writes in a review in Iyyun: Jerusalem Philosophical Quarterly, of A Metaphysics of the Future, “Running contrary to nearly all contemporary Western philosophical currents, Robert Allinson … has written a brilliant defence of a rigorous phenomenological approach to metaphysics … The reference circle for Allinson’s argument is classical Western philosophy of the ancient and modern periods. The footnotes are a wonderful source of continuing commentary on contemporary problems of reading the history of Western philosophy, as well as ongoing debates with our contemporaries … No one has made this case for phenomenological certainty in metaphysics as well as Allinson.”

Robert Allinson introduces a definition of space-time that provides a philosophical and conceptual explanation of the nature of space and time that is independent of and supportive of the Einsteinian discoveries in physics in his monograph Space, Time and the Ethical Foundations. His 2022 publication Awakening Philosophy: The Loss of Truth with Palgrave Macmillan has been commented upon by Slavoj Zîzêk: “Allinson does something that we all secretly knew it has to be done, but nobody dared to actually do it so directly: he convincingly argues for the return to a philosophy that shamelessly addresses big questions. A great sigh of relief will be felt by the readers of Awakening Philosophy: The Loss of Truth: we are back home. If there is justice in our intellectual life, the book will become daily bread for thinking beings.” The book has also received comments from Brian Klug of the University of Oxford and Michael Slote of the Royal Irish Academy.

Eastern and Western philosophy 
Robert Allinson has specialized in Comparative Philosophy, East, West, and South. His book Understanding the Chinese Mind: The Philosophical Roots examined Chinese Philosophy through the categories of Western philosophy and introduced the idea that Western and Chinese philosophies form a complementary whole rather than being two competing outlooks. It is now in its 11th impression with Oxford University Press.

His publication Chuang-Tzu for Spiritual Transformation: An Analysis of the Inner Chapters was a systematic exploration of the Zhuangzi as a linguistic and philosophical method to achieve a neural transformation and provided historical and logical explanations for the paradoxes presented by the Zhuangzi. It has been translated into Chinese and Korean and received a review from the translator Burton Watson. It is in its 8th impression with the State University of New York press.

Robert Allinson has published Harmony and Strife: Contemporary Perspectives, East and West with Shu-hsien Liu in 1989 through Chinese University Press and Columbia University Press. His monograph published in 2020 with Bloomsbury Publishing,The Philosophical Influences of Mao Zedong: Notations, Reflections and Insights, has elicited comments from Slavoj Zîzêk, Anne Cheng of the Collège de France, and Michael Puett of Harvard, as well as reviews from Chinese scholars such as Keqian Xu and Qiong Wang.

Slavoj Žižek has commented: “Mao Ze Dong is celebrated (or cursed) as a revolutionary leader, but the philosophical foundation of his activity is largely ignored. In his superb study, Allinson fills in this lack. Mao’s thought is not just located in its historical context; its complex references to the Chinese traditional thought, to Marx and Western philosophy, but also to modern sciences (quantum physics), are explored and documented. A new Mao thus emerges, a Mao whose radical acts are grounded in a thick texture of philosophical reflections. Allinson’s Mao is indispensable for everybody who wants to understand not just Mao but the concatenation of philosophy and politics that characterized the twentieth century.”

Robert Allinson has been invited by the Chinese philosopher Tang Yijie to be Visiting Professor to Peking University and to the International Academy of Chinese Culture. He has been Visiting Professor or Scholar to Fudan University, Ōtani University, the East-West Center in Hawaii. He was invited by Sir Joseph Needham to be a Visiting Fellow at the University of Cambridge. He has been invited to edit the section on Logic of Volume VII of Science and Civilization in China. He has been invited to give lectures at the Department of Philosophy of the University of Hong Kong, Nanjing University, Gweilin Normal University, a Visiting Lecture at the Edgar Snow House at Peking University, and to direct a two-week seminar on Zhuangzi and the Sixth Patriarch for The Summer Seminar for Zen Studies at the Bodhi Mandala Zen Center in New Mexico.

He has contributed to or been listed in the Encyclopaedia Britannica (print edition), Stanford Encyclopedia of Philosophy (most recent citation Feb 23, 2021 in section, Epistemology in Chinese Philosophy), Encyclopedia of Ethics, Encyclopedia of Crime and Punishment, Internet Encyclopedia of Philosophy, Encyclopedia of Chinese Philosophy, Encyclopedia of Literary Translation into English, Encyclopedia of Asian and Comparative Philosophy, Encyclopedia of Asian Philosophy, Encyclopedia of Eastern Philosophy and Religion, and the Kodansha Encyclopedia of Japan.

Management and environmental ethics 
Robert Allinson has published two books related to Management Ethics and Corporate Ethics, including Global Disasters: Inquiries into Management Ethics [1] with Prentice-Hall and Saving Human Lives: Lessons in Management Ethics with Springer.

The book Saving Human Lives demonstrated that the foundations for sound management and ethical relations were woven out of the same cloth and that risk management is subsidiary to the more fundamental concept of risk assessment. He proposed that corporate disasters are the function and result of unethical management. He also conducted extensive research on the Space Shuttle Challenger Disaster and has given seminars on the Challenger Disaster for the MBA Program at the Darden School of Business at the University of Virginia and for the Department of Management at the Hong Kong University of Science and Technology.

His books have drawn plaudits from Paul Vatter of Harvard University, S. Prakash Sethi, and Patricia Werhane. Patricia Werhane has commented, “His wide-ranging investigation of court cases and government documents from the seventeenth through the twentieth centuries, and from places as diverse as the USA, UK and New Zealand provide ample supporting evidence for the universality and the power of explanation of his thesis. Saving Human Lives will have an impact beyond measurement on the field of management ethics.”

He has been invited to deliver Distinguished Lectures and Annual Lectures for MBA programs at Copenhagen Business School, the Helsinki School of Economics and Business Administration, I.E.S.E. of the University of Navarra, the Shidler School of Business at the University of Hawaii, the Science Prestige Lecture at the University of Canterbury where he was Erskine Fellow to the MBA Program of the Department of Management,  the Institute for Advanced Studies at the United Nations University, and the Shanghai Academy of Social Sciences.

He has offered seminars for the MBA program at the Darden School of Business Administration at the University of Virginia, and the Department of Management at the Hong Kong University for Science and Technology. He was chosen to represent Asia at the seven continent Symposium for Responsibility for World Business sponsored by the United Nations and the Oslo Peace Institute held in Sao Paulo, Brazil. His contribution was later published in the volume, Responsibility for World Business published by the United Nations University. He took part in the 15th European Business Ethics Network Conference and European Ethics Summit and delivered his paper at the European Parliament Building in Brussels. He is a Founding Member of the Asian Academy of Management. He has served on the Editorial Board of Business Ethics Quarterly, The International Journal of Management and Decision Making, The International Journal of Technology Management and has served as referee for the Journal of Business Ethics.

In the area of Applied Ethics and Bioethics, he focuses on the philosophical, economic, cultural, political, and psychological roots of both different national practices in public health ethics and color racism. He has been a supporter of African philosophy.

Jewish-Chinese comparative philosophy 
Robert Allinson is known for his comparison of the proscriptive sentential formulation of the Golden Rule in both Jewish and Chinese Confucian writings. He initiated his career in Holocaust studies in Asia, in Hong Kong and China in the early 1980s. In his work on the Holocaust, he develops the idea that anti-Judaism and acts of hatred are based on jealousy which is derivative from fear. He also critiques the Arendtian portrait of Adolf Eichmann as banal.

He has been Senior Lady Davis Fellow to The Hebrew University of Jerusalem and Research Fellow to the International Institute for Holocaust Research at Yad Vashem, Jerusalem. He has been invited to deliver a paper at the Cambridge Conference on Antisemitism held at the University of Cambridge in 2022.

Varia 
Robert Allinson also possesses an interest in classical Greek philosophy. He was invited to offer a keynote lecture on a synthesis of Plato and Aristotle for the 27th Conference of the International Association of Greek Philosophy in Athens in 2015 and has published on this same subject. In addition, Professor Allinson is keen on finding philosophy in popular literature, particularly detective fiction.

Intellectual biography 
Robert Allinson studied with Charles Hartshorne, heralded by the Encyclopedia Britannica as the leading metaphysician of the twentieth century, who became the co-Director of his doctoral dissertation together with the distinguished Indian novelist, Raja Rao, winner of the Sahitya Akademi Award, India’s highest literary award, and the Neustadt International Prize for Literature. His Doctoral dissertation at the University of Texas at Austin was a set of original dialogues between East and West. He earned the Highest Distinction in Metaphysics and Epistemology, graded by John Findlay and Charles Hartshorne. He was awarded an Oldright Fellowship, one of only two granted. He studied with the Kant scholar, John Silber, the Plato scholar, Alexander Mourelatos, the Hegelian scholars, John Findlay and Errol Harris, and the English translator of Heidegger’s Being and Time, Edward Robinson. He was Teaching Assistant to Marjorie Grene, who studied with Heidegger and Karl Jaspers. Since Charles Hartshorne had been a student of Lord Alfred North Whitehead and Edmund Husserl, Professor Allinson’s educational heritage can be traced back to Husserl, a philosopher whose writings came to influence Professor Allinson’s thinking about Metaphysics. He studied Spinoza, Leibniz, Whitehead and Methods in Metaphysics with Hartshorne. In addition, he studied with Mihoko Nakamura, the private secretary of Daisetz Suzuki in Japan, Reverend Yen Why, the student of the last surviving Ch’ an Buddhist Master from China, Empty Clouds in Hong Kong and Sri Padmanabha Menon, son of Krishna Menon, in Anandavadi, India. He was invited to participate in the Zen Symposium in Kyoto with Nishitani Keiji. He has published on Zen Buddhism in The Eastern Buddhist founded by D. T. Suzuki and on Buddhist economics.

Robert Allinson’s academic career has included being the Chairman of the Department of Philosophy and offered a Full Professorship at West Virginia State University, one of the top five of HBUC, integrated in reverse. He served for twenty-seven years on the Graduate Panel of the Department of Philosophy at The Chinese University of Hong Kong, achieving the rank of Full Professor. He has been a member of the Board of Trustees of Shaw College of The Chinese University of Hong Kong and a Fellow to Shaw College. He has served as External Examiner both to major Research Universities and for promotions from Full Professor to Distinguished Professor at major Research Universities. He is now Professor of Philosophy at Soka University of America and Affiliate Faculty to the University of Haifa. He regularly offers seminars on Metaphysics, the Holocaust, courses in East-West philosophy, and courses in Corporate Social Responsibility and Good Governance and Environmental and Bio-Ethics. He presented a paper on Medical Ethics for the Stanford University Medical School in 2022.

Robert Allinson has long been a supporter of the idea that Philosophy is universal. He has recently served as the Guest Editor for a trilogy of issues of nearly 900 pages on whether we need a new Enlightenment for the 21st century. He referees regularly for Diametros, Philosophy East and West, Asian Philosophy, Dao: A Journal of Comparative Philosophy, the Journal of Chinese Philosophy, as well as a select number of international journals. 

He is also a published poet and has published his poetry in poetry magazines on adjoining pages with Boris Pasternak (Nobel laureate for literature) and Odysseus Elytis (Nobel laureate for literature). He is a winner of an Academy of American Poets Award judged by Octavio Paz (Nobel laureate for literature).

Fellowships and honors 
Robert Allinson has been invited as: 

 Visiting Fellow, Soka University of Japan
 Senior Associate Member, St. Antony's College, Oxford University
 Associate Member, Balliol College, Oxford University
 Visiting Professor, Peking University (Beijing University)
 Visiting Professor, Fudan University
 Visiting Fellow, Oxford University, three times
 Visiting Fellow, Yale University, The Graduate School of Arts and Science, Department of Philosophy
 Nordic Fellow, Nordic Institute of Asian Studies, Copenhagen University in Denmark
 Research Fellow, Niels Bohr Institute, Copenhagen
 Erskine Fellow, The University of Canterbury
 Visiting Professor, Waseda University, Department of Management
 Nominator, Kyoto Prize for the Humanities, in Ethics and Thought
 Nominator, Tang Prize

He currently serves on/as: 
 President, The International Society for Universal Dialogue
 Executive Editorial Board, Dialogue and Universalism, Polish Academy of Sciences
 Advisory Board, Journal of Chinese Philosophy
 Editorial Board, Philosophical Inquiry
 Editorial Board, Asian Philosophy
 Editorial Board, Journal of Daoist Studies
 Editorial Advisory Board, Series on Daoism edited by David Chai for Bloomsbury Academic Books
 Distinguished Advisory Board, The International Society for Comparative Studies of Chinese and Western Philosophy (ISCWP)
 Referee, Philosophy East and West
 Referee, Dao: A Journal of Comparative Philosophy

References 

Living people
American humanities academics
American philosophy academics
Academic staff of the Chinese University of Hong Kong
Yale University faculty
Academics of the University of Oxford
University of Texas at Austin College of Liberal Arts alumni
Southern Illinois University alumni
Year of birth missing (living people)